Jack H. Larsen (born January 13, 1995) is an American professional baseball outfielder in the Seattle Mariners organization.

Career
Larsen attended the University of California, San Diego, where he played college baseball for the UC San Diego Tritons.

The Mariners signed him as an undrafted free agent on June 19, 2017. He made his professional debut with the Arizona League Mariners. In 2018, Larsen split the season between the Single-A Clinton LumberKings and the High-A Modesto Nuts, slashing .246/.364/.432 with 13 home runs and 70 RBI across 114 games. He spent the 2019 season in Modesto, playing in 118 games and hitting .237/.335/.402 with 12 home runs and 63 RBI.

Larsen did not play in a game in 2020 due to the cancellation of the minor league season because of the COVID-19 pandemic. In 2021, he split the season between the High-A Everett AquaSox and the Double-A Arkansas Travelers, slashing .295/.405/.524 with career-highs in home runs (19), RBI (84), and stolen bases (13). He was assigned to the Triple-A Tacoma Rainiers to begin the 2022 season.

On July 31, 2022, Larsen was selected to the 40-man roster and promoted to the major leagues for the first time. He received one plate appearance in his only major league game, striking out against Jake Odorizzi of the Houston Astros. He was designated for assignment on August 2, 2022, and was later outrighted to Tacoma, where he spent the remainder of the season.

On March 10, 2023, it was announced that Larsen would require surgery after suffering a fractured hamate bone during spring training.

References

External links

Living people
1995 births
Sportspeople from Newport Beach, California
Baseball players from California
Major League Baseball outfielders
Seattle Mariners players
UC San Diego Tritons baseball players
Plymouth Pilgrims players
Arizona League Mariners players
Clinton LumberKings players
Modesto Nuts players
Everett AquaSox players
Arkansas Travelers players